Cuarteron may refer to:
 Quadroon 
 Cuarteron Reef